Nuevo Leon State Highway 1 Spur ( NL 1 )is a connector road that connects the Colombia, Nuevo Leon area with NL 1. Before its construction travelers / commercial traffic from the Colombia-Solidarity International Bridge had to travel south via Fed-2 and pass through Nuevo Laredo, Tamaulipas to go to Monterrey, Nuevo Leon.

References

Mexican State Highways
1994 establishments in Mexico
Transportation in Nuevo León